Jim Cain (born 1939) is a former Grey Cup champion Canadian Football League offensive lineman.

Cain was a graduate of the University of Detroit, returning to Canada to play for the Ottawa Rough Riders. A dependable player, who never missed a game in his 9 years, he finished his career with back-to-back Grey Cup championships.

His cousin was Brian Smith of Ottawa, a former National Hockey League goalie and popular sportscaster who was murdered in 1995.

References

External links
Just Sports Stats

Living people
1939 births
Canadian football tackles
American football tackles
Canadian players of American football
Detroit Titans football players
Ottawa Rough Riders players
Players of Canadian football from Ontario
Canadian football people from Toronto